Vouvray may refer to:

 Vouvray, a commune in the Indre-et-Loire department in central France
 Vouvray (wine), an Appellation d'origine contrôlée (AOC, a French certification) for wine from the commune of Vouvray
 Vouvray-sur-Loir, a commune in the Sarthe department in northwestern France
 Vouvray-sur-Huisne, a commune in the Sarthe department in northwestern France